St. Peter's Episcopal Church in Pittsburgh, Pennsylvania,  was an early example of the archaeological phase of Gothic Revival architecture, designed by the Philadelphia architect John Notman.  It was originally built in 1851 at the corner of Grant and Diamond as a chapel of ease for Trinity Episcopal Church in the Diocese of Pittsburgh. The church and its site were purchased by Henry Clay Frick. The building itself was donated back to the congregation. It was dismantled, the stones numbered, and taken up Forbes Avenue in horsedrawn wagons to the corner of Forbes Avenue and Craft, where it was reconstructed in 1901. It received a plaque from the Pittsburgh History and Landmarks Foundation. The church was deconsecrated in September 1989, and the building was demolished.

References

James D. Trump, American Building Series No. 1 St. Peter's, Pittsburgh, by John Notman, The Journal of the Society of Architectural Historians, vol. 15, pp. 19–23 (May, 1956)

Churches in Pittsburgh
Episcopal churches in Pennsylvania
Churches completed in 1851
19th-century Episcopal church buildings
Former Episcopal church buildings in the United States
Pittsburgh History & Landmarks Foundation Historic Landmarks
Former churches in Pennsylvania
1851 establishments in Pennsylvania